Kõivuküla is a village in Kastre Parish, Tartu County in eastern Estonia.

References

 

Villages in Tartu County